Charlevoix County is a county in the U.S. state of Michigan. The county seat is Charlevoix. Located in the Northern Lower Peninsula, Charlevoix County is bisected by Lake Charlevoix, Michigan's third largest inland lake. As of the 2020 Census, the county's population was 26,054.

Beaver Island, the largest island in Lake Michigan, is located within Charlevoix County.

History

1840s: surveyed and organized as Keskkauko County
Between 1840 and 1841, surveyors William Austin Burt, John Mullett and Charles W. Cathcart, surveyed much of Northern Michigan. Cathcart oversaw the internal lines survey for 34N 08W, the region which would later be known as Charlevoix. Mullett and Cathcart laid out many of the townships in the new county including Charlevoix Township.

The county was originally organized in 1840 as Kesk-kauko in honor of a great chief of the Saginaw tribe, and name was changed from Resh-kanko to Charlevoix County in 1843. The county was named in 1843 for Pierre François Xavier de Charlevoix, a Jesuit missionary of the French colonial era.

1853: Strangites gain power and re-organize Keskkauko into Emmet County

In 1847, a group of "Strangite" Mormons settled on Beaver Island and established a "kingdom" led by "King" James Jesse Strang. There were bitter disputes between Strang's followers and other white settlers. Strang, seeking to strengthen his position, gained election to the Michigan State House of Representatives. In January 1853, he pushed through legislation titled, "An act to organize the County of Emmet", which enlarged Emmet County by attaching the nearby Lake Michigan islands to Emmet county, as well as a portion of Cheboygan County and Keskkauko/Resh-kanko/ Charlevoix. Charlevoix was thus organized in 1853 as a township under Emmet County and consisted all of the nine townships in the southern half of Emmet County.

Popular dissatisfaction with Mormon power
Due to Strang's influence, Mormons came to dominate Emmet county government, causing an exodus of many non-Mormon settlers to neighboring areas. In 1855, the non-Mormon resistance succeeded in getting the Michigan Legislature to reorganize Emmet County. The islands, including Beaver Island and North and South Manitou Islands, were transferred into the separate Manitou County, which effectively eliminated Mormons from Emmet County government. After an assassination attempt on June 20, 1856, Strang died three weeks later.

Charlevoix Township splits off to become Charlevoix County in 1869
Emmet County continued to experience tensions as citizens clashed over whether to put the county seat at Little Traverse (Harbor Springs) versus Mackinaw City. In a contested election in 1867, residents voted to move the county seat to Charlevoix, which was upheld by a Circuit Court decision in 1868. However, in 1869, Charlevoix County was split from Emmet County, resulting in Charlevoix being the official county seat for Emmet county as well as for the newly formed Charlevoix County.

County seat wars – Charlevoix vs East Jordan vs Boyne City

In 1873, the Grand Rapids and Indiana Railroad was completed through the eastern side of Charlevoix county up to Petoskey, and the east side of Pine Lake became more and more populated. For example, Resort Township and Springvale Township, Michigan were formed in 1880 as a part of Charlevoix County. As new townships became established, Boyne City colluded with East Jordan to gain a requisite 2/3 majority of township supervisors to vote to move the county seat to East Jordan. In October 1884, 11 of the existing 16 township supervisors designated East Jordan to be the county seat. In October 1886, Boyne City convinced 2/3 of township supervisors to move the county seat to Boyne City.

Finally, in a January 1897 land deal with Emmet County and the state legislature, Charlevoix County took on three townships on Beaver Island while giving up Resort, Bear Lake, and Springvale townships to Emmet County. The resulting balance of township supervisor votes gave the City of Charlevoix enough votes to obtain the county seat after a 13-year hiatus.

Other history
The Ironton Ferry began operation in 1876, and Ironton soon became a location for iron manufacture.

There are ten Michigan state historical markers in the county, and the area was once home to a thriving culture of Odawa fishers, hunters, and fur trappers.:
 Big Rock Point Nuclear Power Plant
 Boyne City United Methodist Church
 Charlevoix Depot
 Greensky Hill Mission
 Horace S. Harsha House
 Horton Bay
 John Porter and Eva Porter Estate
 Mormon Kingdom
 Mormon Print Shop
 Norwood Township Hall

Geography
It is the fourth-smallest county in Michigan by land area.

Mainland Charlevoix County features a shoreline on both Traverse Bays (Grand Traverse Bay and Little Traverse Bay) of Lake Michigan.

Gull, Hat, Pismire, and Shoe Islands, which are part of the Beaver Island archipelago, form the Lake Michigan division of the Michigan Islands National Wildlife Refuge, and two of them are part of the Michigan Islands Wilderness Area.

The county is considered to be part of Northern Michigan.

Adjacent counties
By land
 Emmet County (north)
 Cheboygan County (northeast)
 Otsego County (southeast)
 Antrim County (south)
By water
 Leelanau County (southwest)
 Schoolcraft County (northwest)

National protected area
 Michigan Islands National Wildlife Refuge (part)

Transportation

State highways

County-designated highways

Airports
 Beaver Island is served by two airlines:
 Welke Airport
 Beaver Island Airport

Ferry service
 Beaver Island Boat Company maintains a regular auto ferry from Charlevoix:
 The Ironton Ferry at Ironton, Michigan crosses the south arm of Lake Charlevoix.  It is a designated Michigan Historical Site and has been in operation since 1876.

Bus service
 Indian Trails provides intercity bus service with stops in the city of Charlevoix and Boyne Falls.
 County-wide dial-a-ride bus service is provided by the Charlevoix County Transit System.

Demographics

As of the census of 2000, there were 26,090 people, 10,400 households, and 7,311 families residing in the county.  The population density was 63 people per square mile (24/km2).  There were 15,370 housing units at an average density of 37 per square mile (14/km2).  The racial makeup of the county was 96.31% White, 0.17% Black or African American, 1.54% Native American, 0.23% Asian, 0.09% Pacific Islander, 0.41% from other races, and 1.25% from two or more races.  1.04% of the population were Hispanic or Latino of any race. 21.8% were of German, 12.0% English, 11.0% American, 10.6% Irish and 8.4% Polish ancestry. 97.3% spoke English and 1.1% Spanish as their first language.

There were 10,400 households, out of which 31.80% had children under the age of 18 living with them, 58.40% were married couples living together, 8.10% had a female householder with no husband present, and 29.80% were non-families. 25.20% of all households were made up of individuals, and 10.50% had someone living alone who was 65 years of age or older.  The average household size was 2.48 and the average family size was 2.96.

In the county, 25.90% of the population was under the age of 18, 6.50% from 18 to 24, 27.40% from 25 to 44, 25.20% from 45 to 64, and 14.90% who were 65 years of age or older.  The median age was 39 years. For every 100 females there were 97.90 males.  For every 100 females age 18 and over, there were 94.80 males.

The median income for a household in the county was $39,788, and the median income for a family was $46,260. Males had a median income of $32,457 versus $22,447 for females. The per capita income for the county was $20,130.  About 5.40% of families and 8.00% of the population were below the poverty line, including 10.00% of those under age 18 and 5.90% of those age 65 or over.

Government

The county government operates the jail, maintains rural roads, operates the major local courts,
keeps files of deeds and mortgages, maintains vital records, administers public health regulations, and
participates with the state in the provision of welfare and other social services. The county board of commissioners controls the budget but has only limited authority to make laws or ordinances.  In Michigan, most local government functions – police and fire, building and zoning, tax assessment, street maintenance, etc. — are the responsibility of individual cities and townships. Charlevoix is part of the 114th district.

Communities

Cities
 Boyne City
 Charlevoix (county seat)
 East Jordan

Village
 Boyne Falls

Civil townships

 Bay Township
 Boyne Valley Township
 Chandler Township
 Charlevoix Township
 Evangeline Township
 Eveline Township
 Hayes Township
 Hudson Township
 Marion Township
 Melrose Township
 Norwood Township
 Peaine Township
 South Arm Township
 St. James Township
 Wilson Township

Census-designated places

 Advance
 Bay Shore
 Horton Bay
 Ironton
 Norwood
 St. James
 Walloon Lake

Indian reservations
Charlevoix County contains portions of two Indian reservations, both of which are branches of the federally-recognized Odawa tribe.  The Grand Traverse Band of Ottawa and Chippewa Indians occupies a small reservation in southwest Evaline Township.  The Little Traverse Bay Bands of Odawa Indians has four scattered reservations throughout the county—three small sections in Hayes Township and one isolated section in St. James Township on Beaver Island.

See also
 List of Michigan State Historic Sites in Charlevoix County, Michigan
 National Register of Historic Places listings in Charlevoix County, Michigan

References

External links
 Charlevoix County web site
 Charlevoix Area Chamber of commerce, with links, calendar of events
 

 
Michigan counties
Populated places established in 1869
1869 establishments in Michigan
Church of Jesus Christ of Latter Day Saints (Strangite)